Starting in the 1945 season, on its third year of operation, the All-American Girls Professional Baseball League honored with the Player of the Year Award the top performer in the circuit. The AAGPBL folded at the end of the 1954 season. This is the list of winners.

Winners

See also

 List of sports awards honoring women

Sources
All-American Girls Professional Baseball League Official Website
All-American Girls Professional Baseball League Record Book – W. C. Madden. Publisher: McFarland & Company, 2000. Format: Paperback, 294pp. Language: English. 
 

 
Baseball most valuable player awards
Most valuable player awards
Sports awards honoring women
Awards established in 1945
1945 establishments in the United States
1954 disestablishments in the United States
Awards disestablished in 1954